The 1977 Virginia Slims of Philadelphia  was a women's tennis tournament played on indoor carpet courts at the Palestra in Philadelphia, Pennsylvania in the United States that was part of the 1977 Virginia Slims World Championship Series. It was the sixth edition of the tournament and was held from March 14 through March 20, 1977. First-seeded Chris Evert won the singles title and earned $20,000 first-prize money.

Finals

Singles
 Chris Evert defeated  Martina Navratilova 6–4, 4–6, 6–3
 It was Evert's 5th singles title of the year and the 72nd of her career.

Doubles
 Françoise Dürr /  Virginia Wade defeated  Martina Navratilova /  Betty Stöve 6–4, 4–6, 6–4

Prize money

See also
 Evert–Navratilova rivalry

References

External links
 ITF tournament edition details

Virginia Slims of Philadelphia
Advanta Championships of Philadelphia
Virginia Slims of Philadelphia
Virginia Slims of Philadelphia
Virginia Slims of Philadelphia